Kumeroa is a farming settlement in Tararua District and Manawatū-Whanganui region of New Zealand's North Island. It is about ten minutes' drive from Woodville, on the opposite side of the Manawatū River.

The township consists of a school, community hall, tennis club and church. Most residents live on farms or lifestyle blocks.

Education

The school merged with Hopelands School in 1994 and Kohinui School in 2008.

In 2009, a Ministry of Education review proposed closing eight of the ten schools in the Tararua bush area, including Kuemroa. Principal Jo Gibbs told the Dominion Post she was shocked by the proposal.

The school was then known as Kumeroa-Hopelands School until 2018.

Students at the school have designed, built and run a vegetable garden, chicken coop, worm farm and pizza oven. The school has a wētā house in trees and a greenhouse constructed out of recycled plastic bottles. Students also do pest control and run a beehive at a local QEII National Trust covenant block.

Each year, students also shoot and trap possums for the school's Possum Hunt Gala, take part in the Young Farmer of the Year competition, and sell sunflowers on the side of the road for fundraising.

References

Populated places in Manawatū-Whanganui
Tararua District
Populated places on the Manawatū River